Kevin Doets (born 5 May 1998) is a Dutch professional darts player who competes in Professional Darts Corporation events.

Despite not having a Tour Card, Doets qualified for the 2021 Players Championship Finals, where he lost in the first round to Michael van Gerwen.

At Q-School in 2022, Doets won his Tour Card on by finishing third on the European Q-School Order of Merit, to get himself a two-year card on the PDC circuit.

In 2020, he won his first PDC Development Tour final, and won another one in 2021 and in 2022. In 2020, he also won a Challenge Tour event, followed by another one in 2021.

Performance timeline

PDC European Tour

References

External links

1998 births
Living people
Professional Darts Corporation current tour card holders
Sportspeople from Almere
Dutch darts players